Lekaj is a village and a former municipality situated in the central plains of Albania's Western Lowlands region. It is part of Tirana County. At the 2015 local government reform it became a subdivision of the municipality Rrogozhinë. The population at the 2011 census was 5,126.

References

Administrative units of Rrogozhinë
Former municipalities in Tirana County
Villages in Tirana County